PTK Forensics (PTK) was a non-free, commercial GUI for old versions of the digital forensics tool The Sleuth Kit (TSK). It also includes a number of other software modules for investigating digital media. The software is not developed anymore.

PTK runs as a GUI interface for The Sleuth Kit, acquiring and indexing digital media for investigation.  Indexes are stored in an SQL database for searching as part of a digital investigation. PTK calculates a hash signature (using SHA-1 and MD5) for acquired media for verification and consistency purposes.

References

External links 
 SourceForge.net download site for PTK

Computer forensics
Digital forensics software